The Men's 400 metre freestyle S11 event at the 2016 Paralympic Games took place on 10 September 2016, at the Olympic Aquatics Stadium. No heats were held.

Final 
19:52 10 September 2016:

Notes

Swimming at the 2016 Summer Paralympics